Tracie Savage is an American actress and journalist. She has starred in movies and on television.

Life and career
Savage was born in Ann Arbor, Michigan and raised in the Detroit area. Shortly after her brother, fellow actor Brad Savage (Danny Glick in Salem's Lot) was born, the family relocated from Livonia  Michigan to Los Angeles.  She later returned to Ann Arbor where she graduated from the University of Michigan with a BA in communications, and went on to have a successful 30 year career as a TV broadcast journalist. Her mother, Judy, became a talent agent after Tracie began her acting career. Her television appearances include the role of Christy Kennedy on the NBC TV series Little House on the Prairie from 1974 to 1975. She had originally auditioned for the role of Laura Ingalls. She also made guest appearances on television shows including Love, American Style,
Marcus Welby, M.D., Family, Happy Days, and Here's Boomer. Her film roles include the character "Debbie" in the 1982 horror movie Friday the 13th Part III. After filming the movie, Savage retired from acting to pursue journalism.

Savage started her career as a reporter/anchor in 1985 first working at WEYI-TV in Flint, Michigan, then at WHIO-TV in Dayton, Ohio from 1986 to 1991. After relocating to Los Angeles in 1991, she worked at KCAL-TV. Beginning in March 1994, she was a reporter/anchor at NBC4 in Los Angeles, California for seven years. Since September 2001, she has been the afternoon drive anchor for KFWB, an all-news radio station in Los Angeles.

Savage has covered the Heidi Fleiss and O. J. Simpson civil trials. During the O. J. Simpson trial, Savage was called to the witness stand to reveal her confidential sources, and was threatened with jail time by Judge Ito, but she invoked her rights as journalist to use the shield law to protect the source of her story. In 2005, Savage returned to acting and starred in the movie Loretta.  More recently, she appeared as an anchor on the Internet television network PJTV.

Savage is currently a full-time college professor in Los Angeles. She teaches journalism, broadcasting and film and radio production.

Filmography
Hurricane (1974) (TV) - Liz Damon 
Terror on the 40th Floor (1974) (TV) - Cathy Pierson
The Legend of Lizzie Borden (1975) (TV) - Young Lizzie
Friendly Persuasion (1975) (TV) - Mattie
The Devil and Max Devlin (1981) - Pammy
Friday the 13th Part III (1982) - Debbie
Loretta (2005) - Loretta
Crystal Lake Memories: The Complete History of Friday the 13th  (2013) - Herself (documentary)
The Bone Garden (2014) - Alice Hardy
13 Fanboy (2021) - Herself

References

External links
Official Website

American film actresses
American television actresses
Journalists from Michigan
Living people
Television anchors from Los Angeles
Actors from Ann Arbor, Michigan
Actresses from Dayton, Ohio
University of Michigan alumni
Journalists from Ohio
American women television journalists
21st-century American women
Year of birth missing (living people)